Dieter Johann Eiselen (born June 10, 1996) is a South African-born American football center for the Chicago Bears of the National Football League (NFL). He played college football at Yale and was signed by the Bears after the 2020 NFL Draft.

Early years
Eiselen was born and grew up in South Africa where he played rugby and competed in Olympic weightlifting. Eiselen came to America and played football at Choate Rosemary Hall in Wallingford, Connecticut and helped lead the Wild Boars to an undefeated season and a New England NEPSAC 'A' Championship. Eiselen was also a letterman in track & field at Choate and made the Dean's list.

College career
Eiselen graduated from Yale University in 2020 with degrees in economics and political science. Eiselen started 34 games as a 4 year starter for the Yale Bulldogs. In 2017, Eiselen was selected as a HERO Sports Sophomore All-American and an All-Ivy League honorable mention after helping lead the Yale Bulldogs to an outright Ivy League Championship. In 2018, He was selected First-team All-Ivy League. In 2019, he was selected to Phil Steele's Preseason All-American Team, First-team All-Ivy League, the ECAC All-New England Team, the HERO Sports All-American Team, the STATS FCS All-American Team, and the AP FCS All-American Team after helping Yale to a no. 23/22 national ranking and a second Ivy League championship. Eiselen was selected to participate in the NFLPA Collegiate Bowl in Pasadena, California at the Rose Bowl. He was also inducted into National Football Foundation's Hampshire Honor Society.

Professional career

Eiselen was signed by the Chicago Bears as an undrafted free agent on May 7, 2020. He was waived on September 5, 2020, as part of final roster cuts, and re-signed to the practice squad. He was elevated to the active roster on November 7 for the team's week 9 game against the Tennessee Titans. On January 11, 2021, Eiselen signed a reserve/futures contract with the Bears.

On August 31, 2021, Eiselen was waived by the Bears and re-signed to the practice squad the next day. He signed a reserve/future contract with the Bears on January 11, 2022.

On August 30, 2022, Eiselen was waived by the Bears and signed to the practice squad the next day. He was promoted to the active roster on October 26.

References

External links
 Chicago Bears profile
 Yale Bulldogs profile

1996 births
Living people
American football offensive guards
Chicago Bears players
Yale Bulldogs football players
Choate Rosemary Hall alumni
People from Stellenbosch
South African players of American football
Sportspeople from the Western Cape